Mottram in Longdendale was one of the eight ancient parishes of the Macclesfield Hundred of Cheshire, England. Centred on St Michael and All Angels Church it included the townships of Godley, Hattersley, Hollingworth, Matley, Newton, Stayley, Tintwistle and Mottram itself. Under the Poor Law Amendment Act 1886 the townships became civil parishes in their own right.

Inclusion in municipal boroughs
In 1857 an area of the Stayley township was incorporated as part of the newly created municipal borough of Stalybridge and in 1881 the civil parishes of Godley and Newton were incorporated as part of the new Hyde Municipal Borough. In 1885 the municipal borough of Mossley was created and included parts of Tintwistle and Stayley civil parishes.

Boundary changes

Local Government Act 1894
Under the Local Government Act 1894 several changes came into effect on 31 December of that year. Most of Tintwistle civil parish became part of the new Tintwistle Rural District, with the civil parishes of Hattersley and Matley forming an exclave of the district; On the same day, the new civil parish of Mossley was created and those parts of Tintwistle and Stayley that had been included in the boundaries of the Mossley municipal borough were transferred to the new parish. The rest of the area of Stayley civil parish was transferred to the new civil parish of Stalybridge. Hollingworth civil parish was incorporated as the new, single parish Hollingworth Urban District and the civil parish of Mottram itself became incorporated as the single parish Mottram Urban District.

On 1 October 1923 Godley and Newton civil parishes were abolished and their areas became part of Hyde civil parish.

Local Government Act 1929
Under a review conducted under the Local Government Act 1929 the boundaries of Cheshire were adjusted on 1 April 1936. Hollingworth and Mottram in Longendale civil parishes and urban districts were abolished and they were both included in the new Longendale civil parish and Urban District. Hattersley and Matley civil parishes were abolished and their area, which had been an exclave of Tintwistle Rural District, were divided between Stalybridge CP, Hyde CP and the new Longendale CP. Stalybridge CP gained  of Matley.

References

Geography of Tameside